Poikiloderma is a skin condition that consists of areas of hypopigmentation, hyperpigmentation, telangiectasias and atrophy.
Poikiloderma of Civatte is most frequently seen on the chest or the neck, characterized by red colored pigment on the skin that is commonly associated with sun damage.

Types
 Poikiloderma vasculare atrophicans
 Poikiloderma of Civatte
 Hereditary sclerosing poikiloderma

Causes
Congenital
Rothmund-Thompson syndrome
Dyskeratosis congenita
Mendes da Costa syndrome

Other hereditary causes
Degos-Touraine syndrome
Diffuse and macular atrophic dermatosis
Hereditary sclerosing poikiloderma of weary
Kindler syndrome
Xeroderma pigmentosum

Acquired
Injury to cold, heat, ionizing radiation, exposure to sensitizing chemicals
Lichen planus
Dermatomyositis
Lupus erythematosus
Systemic sclerosis
Cutaneous T cell lymphomas

Pathogenesis
The exact cause of poikiloderma of Civatte is unknown; however, extended sun exposure, namely the ultraviolet light emitted by the sun, is the primary factor.

Diagnosis

Treatment
Albeit difficult, treatment of poikiloderma of Civatte involves the delivery of multiple wavelengths of intense pulsed light (IPL) to the affected area.

See also
 Osteopoikilosis
 List of cutaneous conditions

References

Disturbances of human pigmentation